is a Japanese former football player.

Career
Kazuto Nishida joined Gamba Osaka in 2016. On May 1, he debuted in J3 League (v Blaublitz Akita).

Nishida announcement officially retirement from football on 16 January 2023.

Reserves performance

Last Updated: 31 December 2016

References

External links

1998 births
Living people
Association football people from Hyōgo Prefecture
Japanese footballers
J1 League players
J3 League players
Japan Football League players
Gamba Osaka players
Gamba Osaka U-23 players
MIO Biwako Shiga players
Association football midfielders